Jorge  is a Spanish  and Portuguese given name.

The Latin form Georgius had been rarely given in Western Christendom since at least the 6th century.
The popularity of the name however develops from around the 12th century, in Occitan in the form Jordi, and it becomes popular at European courts after the publication of the Golden Legend in the 1260s.

The West Iberian form Jorge is on record as the name of Jorge de Lencastre, Duke of Coimbra (1481–1550).

List of people with the given name Jorge
 Jorge (footballer, born 1946), Brazilian footballer
 Jorge (Brazilian singer), Brazilian musician and singer, Jorge & Mateus
 Jorge (Romanian singer), real name George Papagheorghe, Romanian singer, actor, TV host
 Jorge Betancourt, Cuban diver
 Jorge Campos, Mexican football player
 Jorge Cantú, baseball player
 Jorge Cham, web comic writer
 Jorge Chavez, French-Peruvian aviator
 Jorge Cimadevilla, American football player
 Jorge Coll, Spanish art dealer
 Jorge Costa, football player
 Jorge Donn, Argentine-born ballet dancer
 Jorge Ebanks, Cayman Islands basketball player
 Jorge De La Rosa, baseball pitcher
 Jorge Eliécer Gaitán, Colombian politician assassinated in 1948
 Jorge Enrique Adoum (1926–2009), Ecuadorian writer
 Jorge Garbajosa, Spanish basketball player
 Jorge Garcia, American actor and comedian
 Jorge García Torre, Spanish footballer known as Jorge
 Jorge Gómez, Chilean football player
 Jorge Guillén, Spanish poet
 Jorge Gutiérrez, Argentine squash player
 Jorge Gutierrez, Mexican animator
 Jorge Herrera (swimmer), Puerto Rican freestyle swimmer
 Jorge Herrera (footballer), Colombian footballer
 Jorge Humberto Martínez, Colombian road cyclist
 Jorge Julio, baseball player
 Jorge Lencina, Argentine judoka
 Jorge Liderman, American
 Jorge Linck, Argentine sailor
 Jorge Lorenzo, Spanish motorcycle racer 
 Jorge Luis Alcantar Bolly, Mexican professional wrestler known as El Hijo del Fantasma and Santos Escobar
 Jorge Luis Borges, Argentine author
 Jorge Marco de Oliveira Moraes, Brazilian footballer
 Jorge Mario Bergoglio, Argentine Roman Catholic priest who became Pope Francis
 Jorge Martín, Spanish motorcyle racer
 Jorge Masvidal, Cuban American Mixed Martial Artist
 Jorge Mondragón, Mexican diver
 Jorge Montenegro (disambiguation), multiple people
 Jorge Negrete, Mexican actor
 Jorge Nuno Pinto da Costa, Portuguese chairman of FC Porto
 Jorge Otálvaro, Colombian road cyclist
 Jorge Orta, baseball player
 Jorge Páez, Mexican boxer and actor
 Jorge Pescara, Brazilian musician
 Jorge Posada, baseball catcher
 Jorge Querejeta, Argentine field hockey player
 Jorge Quinteros, Argentine football player
 Jorge Quinteros, Chilean mountaineer
 Jorge Racca, Argentine basketball player
 Jorge Rafael Videla, 43rd Argentine president and dictator
 Jorge Ramos, Mexican-born American Spanish-language news anchor
 Jorge Richardson, Puerto Rican track and field athlete
 Jorge Rodríguez, Salvadoran footballer
 Jorge Sampaio, Portuguese President
 Jorge Santana, Mexican-born guitarist, brother of Carlos
 Jorge Semprún, Spanish writer and politician
 Jorge Solís, Mexican boxer
 Jorge Taufua, Australian rugby player 
 Jorge Valdano, Argentine football player
 Jorge Villavicencio (1958–2020), Guatemalan politician and physician
 Seu Jorge, Brazilian musician
  Jorge Ruiz, Soccer Player

See also 
 Storm Jorge in the 2019–20 European windstorm season

References 

Portuguese masculine given names
Spanish masculine given names